The 2017 New York Jets season was the franchise's 48th season in the National Football League, the 58th overall and the third under head coach Todd Bowles.

After losing their first two games, the first such start to a season since 2007, the Jets had an impressive three-game winning streak to improve to 3–2. However, the Jets collapsed and ended up winning only two games after Week 5. They equaled their record from the previous season, missed the playoffs for a seventh consecutive season, and were the solitary AFC team to not have one player make the Pro Bowl. It was the first time the Jets had won seven or fewer games in consecutive seasons since their 4–28 two-season streak of 1995 and 1996.

Transactions

Coaching staff and front office personnel changes

Arrivals
The Jets signed defensive lineman Kenny Anunike and Claude Pelon, receiver Darius Jennings, fullback Chris Swain and tight end Jason Vander Laan to reserve/future contracts on January 2, 2017. 
The Jets signed kicker Ross Martin to a reserve/future contract on January 4, 2017.
The Jets signed long snapper Zach Triner to a reserve/future contract on January 5, 2017.
The Jets signed fullback Julian Howsare and receivers Myles White and Deshon Foxx to reserve/future contracts on January 11, 2017.
The Jets signed outside linebacker Frank Beltre to a reserve/future contract on January 14, 2017.
The Jets signed inside linebacker Jeff Luc to a reserve/future contract on January 18, 2017.
The Jets signed receiver Frankie Hammond to a reserve/future contract on January 23, 2017.
The Jets signed long snapper Josh Latham and claimed defensive lineman Mike Pennel off waivers on February 7, 2017.
The Jets signed offensive lineman Jeff Adams on February 8, 2017.
The Jets signed offensive lineman Kelvin Beachum and kicker Chandler Catanzaro on March 10, 2017.
The Jets signed cornerback Morris Claiborne on March 18, 2017.
The Jets signed quarterback Josh McCown on March 20, 2017.
The Jets signed wide receiver Quinton Patton on March 23, 2017.
The Jets signed offensive lineman Jonotthan Harrison on March 28, 2017.
The Jets signed tight end Brian Parker on April 6, 2017.
The Jets signed cornerback John Ojo on April 7, 2017.
The Jets signed linebacker Julian Stanford on April 17, 2017.
The Jets claimed offensive lineman Alex Balducci off waivers on May 3, 2017.
The Jets signed undrafted free agent linebackers Austin Calitro and Connor Harris, wide receivers Brisly Estime and Gabe Marks, cornerback Xavier Coleman, fullback/tight end Anthony Firkser, defensive lineman Patrick Gamble and offensive lineman Javarius Leamon.
The Jets signed offensive linemen Ben Braden and Chris Bordelon on May 7, 2017.
The Jets claimed K. D. Cannon off waivers on May 9, 2017.
The Jets signed linebacker Jevaris Jones on May 15, 2017.
The Jets signed wide receiver Deshon Foxx on May 22, 2017.
The Jets signed defensive back Corey White on May 25, 2017.
The Jets signed wide receiver Chris Harper on May 30, 2017.
The Jets signed defensive back Shamarko Thomas on June 1, 2017.
The Jets signed wide receiver Devin Street on June 5, 2017.
The Jets signed linebacker Spencer Paysinger on June 9, 2017.
The Jets signed running back Jordan Todman on June 13, 2017.
The Jets signed wide receiver Marquess Wilson on June 20, 2017.
The Jets claimed wide receiver Lucky Whitehead off waivers on July 26, 2017.
The Jets claimed running back Marcus Murphy off waivers on July 27, 2017.
The Jets signed tight end Chris Gragg on July 28, 2017.
The Jets signed defensive lineman Devon Still and Jeremy Faulk and wide receiver Bruce Ellington on August 4, 2017.
The Jets signed fullback Algie Brown on August 5, 2017.
The Jets claimed defensive back Robenson Therezie off waivers on August 13, 2017.
The Jets signed wide receiver Daniel Williams on August 14, 2017.
The Jets signed wide receiver Kenbrell Thompkins on August 16, 2017.
The Jets signed tight end Brandon Barnes on August 23, 2017.
The Jets claimed defensive end Kony Ealy off waivers on August 27, 2017.
The Jets signed cornerback Armagedon Draughn on August 28, 2017.
The Jets claimed wide receivers Kalif Raymond and Damore'ea Stringfellow, tight end Will Tye, and linebacker Edmond Robinson off waivers on September 3, 2017.
The Jets signed linebacker Bruce Carter on September 4, 2017.

Departures
Kicker Nick Folk and right tackle Breno Giacomini were released on February 23, 2017.
Center Nick Mangold was released on February 25, 2017.
Wide receiver Brandon Marshall was released on March 3, 2017.
Cornerback Darrelle Revis and running back Khiry Robinson were released on March 9, 2017.
Defensive lineman Kenny Anunike and Julien Obioha, linebacker Jeff Luc, running back Brandon Burks, wide receiver Darius Jennings and long snapper Josh Latham were waived on April 26, 2017.
Safety Marcus Gilchrist was released and fullback Chris Swain and cornerback Nick Marshall were waived on May 4, 2017.
Cornerback John Ojo was waived on May 6, 2017.
Offensive lineman Donald Hawkins and long snapper Zach Triner were released on May 7, 2017.
Wide receiver Deshon Foxx was waived on May 9, 2017.
Linebacker Austin Calitro was released on May 15, 2017.
Wide receiver Brisly Estime was waived on May 25, 2017.
Tight end Braedon Bowman was waived on May 30, 2017.
Linebacker Jervaris Jones was waived on June 1, 2017.
Linebacker David Harris was released on June 6, 2017.
Wide receiver Eric Decker was released on June 12, 2017.
Wide receiver Devin Street was waived on July 26, 2017.
Running back Brandon Wilds was waived on July 27, 2017.
Wide receiver K. D. Cannon was waived on July 28, 2017.
Defensive lineman Brandin Bryant was waived on August 4, 2017.
Wide receiver Bruce Ellington was waived on August 5, 2017.
Fullback Algie Brown was waived on August 13, 2017.
Wide receiver Deshon Foxx was waived on August 14, 2017.
Safety Doug Middleton was waived on August 16, 2017.
Wide receiver Marquess Wilson was released on August 23, 2017.
Defensive lineman Anthony Johnson was waived on August 27, 2017.
Defensive lineman Devon Still was released on August 28, 2017.
Offensive lineman Jeff Adams and Craig Watts, wide receivers Chris Harper and Myles White, tight end Brandon Barnes, defensive lineman Jeremy Faulk, linebacker Spencer Paysinger, defensive backs Armagedon Draughn and David Rivers and kicker Ross Martin were released on September 1, 2017.
Running backs Anthony Firkser, Romar Morris and Jahad Thomas, wide receivers Frankie Hammond, Gabe Marks, Lucky Whitehead and Dan Williams, offensive lineman Alex Balducci, Chris Bordelon, Ben Braden and Javarius Leamon, defensive lineman Patrick Gamble, Deon Simon and Lawrence Thomas, linebackers Frank Beltre and Connor Harris, defensive backs Xavier Coleman and Robenson Therezie were waived and wide receiver Kenbrell Thompkins, safety Shamarko Thomas, and long snapper Tanner Purdum were released on September 2, 2017.
Running back Marcus Murphy, tight end Jason Vander Laan and linebacker Freddie Bishop were waived and linebacker Bruce Carter was released on September 3, 2017.

Practice squad

Arrivals
The Jets signed linebacker Frank Beltre, offensive lineman Ben Braden, cornerback Xavier Coleman and defensive lineman Deon Simon to the practice squad on September 3, 2017.
The Jets signed defensive lineman Patrick Gamble, linebacker Freddie Bishop, offensive lineman Geoff Gray, running back Marcus Murphy, wide receiver JoJo Natson and cornerback Terrell Sinkfield to the practice squad on September 4, 2017.

Trades
The Jets traded safety Calvin Pryor to the Cleveland Browns for linebacker Demario Davis on June 1, 2017.
The Jets traded cornerback Dexter McDougle to the Philadelphia Eagles for safety Terrence Brooks on August 27, 2017.
The Jets traded safety Ronald Martin to the Indianapolis Colts for long snapper Thomas Hennessy on August 28, 2017.
The Jets traded defensive lineman Sheldon Richardson and a 2018 seventh round pick to the Seattle Seahawks for a second and seventh round pick in 2018 and wide receiver Jermaine Kearse on September 1, 2017.

Free agency

Draft

Notes
 As the result of a negative differential of free agent signings and departures that the Jets experienced during the  free agency period, the team received a third round compensatory selection in 2017 draft. The Jets traded their 2017 fourth round selection to Washington to trade up for Brandon Shell in the 2016 draft.

Staff

Final roster

Preseason

Regular season

Schedule

Note: Intra-division opponents are in bold text.

Game summaries

Week 1: at Buffalo Bills

Week 2: at Oakland Raiders

Week 3: vs. Miami Dolphins

Week 4: vs. Jacksonville Jaguars

Week 5: at Cleveland Browns

Week 6: vs. New England Patriots

Week 7: at Miami Dolphins

Week 8: vs. Atlanta Falcons

Week 9: vs. Buffalo Bills

Week 10: at Tampa Bay Buccaneers

Week 12: vs. Carolina Panthers

Week 13: vs. Kansas City Chiefs

Week 14: at Denver Broncos

Week 15: at New Orleans Saints

Week 16: vs. Los Angeles Chargers

Week 17: at New England Patriots

Standings

Division

Conference

References

External links
 

New York Jets seasons
New York Jets
New York Jets season
21st century in East Rutherford, New Jersey
Meadowlands Sports Complex